Joseph Marie may refer to:
 Joseph Marie, baron de Gérando, French jurist, philanthropist and philosopher
 Joseph Marie, Count Dessaix, French general